MLG may refer to any of the following:
 Málaga, often used as an abbreviation for the city in Andalusia, southern Spain. 
 Major League Gaming, a competitive video gaming league in the United States
 Maple Leaf Gardens, a disused arena in Toronto, formerly the home of the Toronto Maple Leafs
 Marine Logistics Group (formerly FSSG), a United States Marine Corps unit that provides logistical support to a Marine Expeditionary Force
 Middle Low German, a language descended from Old Saxon and the ancestor of modern Low German
 Mennonite Low German, a variety of modern Low German
 MLG Productions, a joint venture between Marvel Animation and Lionsgate
 Main Landing Gear, the first and more robust group of landing gears in aircraft
 Michelle Lujan Grisham, 32nd Governor of New Mexico
 Multi-level governance, the idea that there are many interacting authority structures in the emergent global political economy 
 Multi-link gearbox, an implementation agreement published by the Optical Internetworking Forum
 Mixed-linkage glucan, a polysaccharide found within Poales and Equisetum plants. 
 The IATA airport code for Abdul Rachman Saleh Airport, which serves Malang, East Java and Indonesia
 MLG, the ISO 630 code for the Malagasy language
 MLg United States Geological Survey (USGS) seismic magnitude scale